Murton is a village in County Durham, England.

Originally a rural agricultural hamlet called Morton, the discovery of coal beneath its fields in the 19th century transformed it into an industrial community. 'Morton became known as Murton Colliery or Murton-in-the-Whins following the sinking of the pit in 1838 by South Hetton Coal Company, and the village was a productive coal mining community for over a century. The pit employed over 1000 men at its peak and featured in a Picture Post article showing the 'vesting' of the mine at nationalisation in 1947.

The village also had the South East Durham Cooperative Bakery and a Northern Bus Company garage as added sources of jobs. In 1955 a by product works for coal was established for the production mainly of coke. The mine and other employment opportunities closed in the 1990s along with many other County Durham mines and now the old spoil heaps are host to a retail outlet development Dalton Park, bringing much needed new employment.

History

The discovery of coal beneath the fields of East Durham during the 19th century, transformed the tiny hamlet of Morton into the thriving township of Murton.

Decades later, however, the decision to close Murton's successful colliery almost, but not quite, succeeded in turning the close-knit community into a ghost town. Millions of pounds in Government and private investment is now being pumped into Murton, changing the face of the former pit village on an almost daily basis.

Fewer than 100 people lived in the village of Murton before 1830 but, following the sinking of the mine in 1838, the population grew to 1,387 by 1851. Miners flocked to Murton from across County Durham and Northumberland in the early years, with people later uprooting from Devon, Cornwall and Ireland too. Many of the road and place names reflected the original roots of these pitmen, like the Cornwall estate, and dozens of different accents could be heard in the streets.

Work on the colliery – one of the pioneering mines of the East Durham coalfield, began on 19 February 1838 but it was five years before the first coals were drawn. Problems with pockets of shifting sand and the depth of the magnesium limestone overlying the coal delayed the work, making the project hugely expensive. Late shifts were even introduced for the first time, so that excavation could be carried out around the clock to finish the three-shafted pit as quickly as possible.

Just five years after the colliery opened, however, there was an explosion on 15 August 1848, near the Polka East shaft, which killed 16 miners. The tragedy left villagers shaken, but the village itself continued to flourish. Indeed, by 1856 Murton was almost unrecognisable from the hamlet it had once been. Scores of terraced houses had been built to house the miners and the village now boasted three pubs, a new school, plus gas and coke works. As prospective miners continued to flood in, so the number of tradesmen grew, with Murton Colliery Co-operative Society helping to serve the village by 1890.

As the village flourished, so too did the colliery. It was modernised after World War I and, in 1922, a Koepe friction winding engine was installed in the West Pit. New pithead baths followed in 1939, described as being "of especially pleasant design," and Murton'''s swimming pool was opened in 1961.

But, despite high productivity and a loyal workforce, the decision was taken to close the pit in 1991. Campaigners fought against the plans, but failed to stop them. The Koepe winding engine was transferred to the Bowes Railway following the controversial closure and, in 1994, the colliery's winding tower was demolished. Murton's once-thriving pit community was now no more.

Timeline

Old village streets and their nicknames

Governance
An electoral ward in the same name exists. This ward includes Dalton-le-Dale and surrounding areas and has a total population taken at the 2011 Census of 7,975.

Economy
This is a chart of trend of regional gross value added of County Durham at current basic prices published (pp. 240–253) by Office for National Statistics'' with figures in millions of British Pounds Sterling.

Climate

Like the rest of the United Kingdom, Murton has a temperate climate. The area sees on average 1374.6 hours of sunshine per year, compared with a national average of 1125.0 hours. There is frost on 52 days compared with a national average of 55.6 days. Average daily maximum and minimum temperatures are  compared with a national averages of  respectively.

The table below gives the average temperature and rainfall figures taken between 1971 and 2000 at the Met Office weather station in Durham:

See also
 Durham
 Seaham
 Durham Miners' Gala
 Sunderland, Tyne and Wear
 Dawdon
 Easington

References

External links

 Old photos of Murton Colliery, in a slide show form, YouTube (slideshow video featuring the pits of old County Durham - including Murton)
 News stories about Murton, Sunderland Echo
 A thousand old photos of Seaham and Murton, east-durham.co.uk

 
Villages in County Durham
Civil parishes in County Durham